Andrew Wegman Bird (born July 11, 1973) is an American indie rock multi-instrumentalist, singer, and songwriter. Since 1996, he has released 16 studio albums, as well as several live albums and EPs, spanning various genres including swing music, indie rock, and folk music. He is primarily known for his unique style of violin playing, accompanied by loop and effect pedals, whistling, and voice. In the 1990s, he sang and played violin in several jazz ensembles, including Squirrel Nut Zippers and Kevin O'Donnell's Quality Six. He went on to start his own swing ensemble, Andrew Bird's Bowl of Fire, which released three albums between 1998 and 2001. Weather Systems (2003) was his first solo album after Bowl of Fire disbandment, and it marked a departure from jazz music into indie music. Bird's 2019 album My Finest Work Yet was nominated for "Best Folk Album" at the 2020 Grammy Awards.

Beyond his own record releases, he has collaborated with various artists, including The Handsome Family, Dosh, Fiona Apple, and Nora O'Connor.

He has also had a career in film, as a soundtrack composer as well as an actor. He appeared as "Dr. Stringz" in a 2007 episode of Jack's Big Music Show. In 2010, he appeared on a TED Talk performing his music. He wrote and performed "The Whistling Caruso" for The Muppets movie in 2011, and composed the score for the television series Baskets, released in 2016. In 2019, Andrew Bird was cast for the fourth installment of Fargo, playing, "a character, written specifically for him, named 'Thurman Smutney'."

Biography

Early life and the Bowl of Fire (1973–2002)
Trained in the Suzuki method from the age of four, Bird graduated from Lake Forest High School in 1991 and Northwestern University with a bachelor's degree in violin performance in 1996. That same year he self-released his first solo album, Music of Hair. Vastly different from his later work, this album showcased his violin skills and paid tribute to his fascination with both American and European folk traditions, as well as jazz and blues. Following this, his initial commercial exposure came through collaborative work with the band Squirrel Nut Zippers, appearing on three of their albums (Hot, Sold Out, and Perennial Favorites) between 1996 and 1998.

Taking on the role of bandleader, Bird released Thrills on Rykodisc in 1998 with his group Andrew Bird's Bowl of Fire, shortly followed by a second album Oh! The Grandeur in 1999. Both albums were heavily influenced by traditional folk, pre-war jazz, and swing, with Bird relying on the violin as his primary musical instrument, as well as providing vocals along with his trademark verbose lyrics.  The Bowl of Fire featured musicians from Bird's hometown of Chicago, including Kevin O'Donnell, Joshua Hirsch, Jon Williams, Nora O'Connor, Andy Hopkins, Jimmy Sutton, Colin Bunn, and Ryan Hembrey. During this period, Andrew Bird was a member of the jazz group Kevin O'Donnell's Quality Six, for which he was the lead singer and violinist and contributed to arrangements and songwriting for the albums Heretic Blues (Delmark 1999) and Control Freak (Delmark 2000) (both Delmark albums were produced by Raymond Salvatore Harmon).

In 2001, the Bowl of Fire released their third album, The Swimming Hour, a dramatic departure from their previous recordings. It featured a mixture of styles, from the zydeco-influenced "Core and Rind" to more straightforward rock songs such as "11:11". Due to this eclectic nature, Bird has often referred to it as his "jukebox album".  Although gaining critical praise (The Swimming Hour received a 9.0 from indie music website Pitchfork), the band failed to attain commercial success or recognition, playing to audiences as small as 40 people. In 2002, Bird was asked to open for a band in his hometown of Chicago, but fellow Bowl of Fire members were unavailable for the date.  The reluctant Bird performed the gig alone, and the surprising success of this solo show suggested potential new directions for his music.

Early solo career (2003–2005)

The Bowl of Fire unofficially disbanded in 2003, and Bird went on to radically reinvent himself as a solo artist. His two subsequent albums were released on Ani Difranco's Righteous Babe Records label. 2003's Weather Systems (originally released on Grimsey Records) was a sparse record with a dramatic change in musical direction.  It featured the tracks "Skin" and "I", proto-versions of songs that would later become "Skin Is, My" (The Mysterious Production of Eggs) and "Imitosis" (Armchair Apocrypha).  On May 10, 2004, Andrew appeared on the Woodsongs Old-Time Radio Hour where he performed "First Song" and "Action Adventure" both from the Weather Systems album.  He discussed and demonstrated looping, which was how he could perform solo and still have a fully finished sound.

The Mysterious Production of Eggs (2005) continued a progression towards an eclectic indie–folk sound, and both records formed a stark stylistic break with Bird's earlier work, swapping the lush backing of a full band for carefully layered samples of sound constructed using multitrack recorders and loop pedals. As his sound changed, Bird made increasing use of guitar, glockenspiel, and whistling in his songwriting, in addition to his traditional violin and vocals.

Bird is noted for improvising and reworking his songs during live performance, as can be seen in his series of self-released live compilations entitled Fingerlings, Fingerlings 2, Fingerlings 3, and Fingerlings 4, the first of which was released in 2002. Each Fingerlings EP was released prior to a studio album, and presented a mixture of live performances from different shows, including old tracks, covers, and previously unreleased songs, some of which have since appeared on studio albums. Fingerlings 3, released in October 2006, also featured studio outtakes.  Fingerlings 2 provided Bird with an unexpected boost in recognition in 2004 when it was named album of the month by Mojo.

In 2005, collaborator Martin Dosh joined Bird's line-up, adding percussion and keyboards to his sound. Jeremy Ylvisaker was later added to the group on bass and backup vocals.

Signed to Fat Possum Records (2006–2011)

In September 2006, Bird signed to Fat Possum Records, and in March 2007 he released his third post-Bowl of Fire album, Armchair Apocrypha. The album was recorded in collaboration with electronic musician Martin Dosh, and includes a track composed by Dosh (with lyrics by Bird) entitled "Simple X". This song first appeared without Bird's lyrics as "Simple Exercises" on Dosh's 2004 release Pure Trash. The album was produced by Ben Durrant (who had worked on Dosh's The Lost Take), and also featured Haley Bonar and Chris Morrissey. In advance of the March release date, Armchair Apocrypha was leaked to the Internet in January 2007.  The album went on to sell over 100,000 copies.

As publicity for Armchair Apocrypha, Bird made his network television debut on April 10, 2007, performing "Plasticities" (from the new album) on the Late Show with David Letterman.  He also appeared on Late Night with Conan O'Brien on June 14, 2007, performing "Imitosis" from the same album. In April 2007, he did a Take-Away Show acoustic video session shot by Vincent Moon. These appearances were accompanied by an extensive tour, which ended with sell-out performances at the Beacon Theatre, New York and the Orpheum Theater, Los Angeles.

In January 2007, Bird made an appearance on the Noggin television network's Jack's Big Music Show, playing the part of Dr. Stringz and appearing in order to mend Mary's broken dulcimer. Bird sang a brief song called "Dr. Stringz", written specially for the show. He now often plays it live as an introduction to the song "Fake Palindromes".

On May 20, 2007, National Public Radio aired a live concert by Bird from Washington, D.C.'s 9:30 Club He also worked with Reverb, a non-profit environmental organization, for his 2007 spring tour.

Five of his songs – "Banking on a Myth" from "The Mysterious Production of Eggs," a medley of "I" from Weather Systems and "Imitosis" from "Armchair Apocrypha," and "Skin" and "Weather Systems" from Weather Systems – have been licensed for use by Marriott Residence Inn.

Since March 2008, Bird has contributed to "Measure for Measure," a New York Times blog in which musicians write about their songwriting process. In it, he has charted the development of the song "Oh No," previewing samples at various stages of development through to the finished album recording. He also discussed the conception of the song "Natural Disaster," the recording of instrumental piece "Hot Math," and previewed "Master Sigh."  The first two songs were later released on Bird's 2009 album Noble Beast, whilst the latter two appeared on its bonus disc Useless Creatures. "Oh No" was featured in the show Billions.

In November 2008, he appeared in the second series of Nigel Godrich's From the Basement alongside Radiohead and Fleet Foxes. His performance included a preview of new song "Section 8 City," a ten-minute re-imagining of "Sectionate City," which originally appeared on the Soldier on EP.

Bird's fifth solo album, "Noble Beast," was released on January 20, 2009, and contained fourteen new songs, with bonus tracks available for download from iTunes and eMusic.  "The Privateers" is a re-imagining of a very early song entitled "The Confession" from 1999's "Oh! The Grandeur." A limited deluxe edition of the album included alternate packaging and artwork, as well as an all-instrumental companion disc entitled "Useless Creatures." The entirety of "Useless Creatures" was made available via Bird's website during the run-up to the release.  "Noble Beast" has been met with generally favourable reviews, receiving a score of 79 out of 100 from review collation site Metacritic.

In 2009, he contributed a cover of the song "The Giant of Illinois" to the HIV and AIDS benefit album Dark Was the Night produced by the Red Hot Organization. On May 11, 2009, Bird released the EP "Fitz and the Dizzy Spells." It contains "Fitz and the Dizzyspells" from "Noble Beast," as well as other songs from that album's recording sessions. Some of the songs on the EP were previously available for download from iTunes and eMusic as bonus tracks to "Noble Beast."

He also did a La Blogoteque performance at a house party in Paris, collaborating with St. Vincent.

In 2010, Bird recorded with the Preservation Hall Jazz Band, contributing vocals and violin on a cover of "Shake It and Break It" on "Preservation: An Album to Benefit Preservation Hall & The Preservation Hall Music Outreach Program." In August 2010, Bird contributed a charity T-shirt to the Yellow Bird Project to raise money for the Pegasus Special Riders Fund, which provides therapeutic horse riding activities for adults and children with special needs.

Break It Yourself (2011–2015)
In late 2011 Bird signed to the record label Mom + Pop Music. Andrew Bird's first release for the label was the soundtrack to the film Norman, which included his original score as well as songs by other artists. Bird sequenced the soundtrack to flow as a stand-alone album rather than a compilation of music from the film. Its music supervisor, Peymon Maskan, told HitQuarters: "The best compliment I've heard is that without having seen the film, you can imagine it by listening to the soundtrack. The sequence is a big part of that effect."

On December 6, Bird announced a new album Break it Yourself, the follow up to 2009's Noble Beast.

In 2011 "Andrew Bird: Fever Year", a feature-length concert documentary on Bird's year-long tour, had its World Premiere at Lincoln Center with the prestigious New York Film Festival. The film's festival-only run closed in 2013 after screening in over ninety international festivals and winning nine awards. "Fever Year" depicts Bird and his band during the final months of a tour during which he reportedly suffered from constant fever. When asked on her website if the film will be released on DVD, director Xan Aranda stated that the film was commissioned by and belongs to Bird, thus the release is up to him to decide. Andrew Bird: Fever Year also features Martin Dosh, Michael Lewis, Jeremy Ylvisaker, and St. Vincent (Annie Clark).

In September 2012, Bird announced Hands Of Glory, a companion EP to Break it Yourself. The album was released on October 30.

In 2014, Andrew Bird's song "Pulaski at Night" was featured in the second-season premiere episode of Orange Is the New Black. "Pulaski at Night" was also featured in the first season of Paolo Sorrentino's The Young Pope.

On June 10, 2014, Andrew Bird released his album Things Are Really Great Here, Sort Of…, an album of covers of The Handsome Family and Bird's first record that does not contain any of his own compositions.

Are You Serious (2016–2018)

On April 1, 2016, Bird released his tenth solo album, Are You Serious with Loma Vista Recordings. The album featured guest vocals from Fiona Apple and includes Bird's earlier track, "Pulaski at Night", now renamed "Pulaski." A total of 6 songs from the album have been released as singles as of August 2017.

Andrew Bird toured in support of Are You Serious through much of 2016 and 2017.

He appeared in episode 14 of the Hulu series The Path, February 8, 2017, playing "Roma Fade" as part of a "private concert".

On November 2, 2018, he released the single "Bloodless" backed with "Capital Crimes".

My Finest Work Yet (2019–present)

On March 22, 2019, Bird released My Finest Work Yet via Loma Vista Recordings. Produced by Paul Butler and Bird, the album was recorded live to tape at Barefoot Studios in Los Angeles, CA, emulating the production and sound of mid-20th century jazz recordings engineered by Rudy Van Gelder. Featured singles included "Bloodless", "Sisyphus" and "Manifest". My Finest Work Yet was nominated for "Best Folk Album" at the 2019 Grammy Awards.

In 2019, Andrew Bird was cast for the fourth installment of Fargo, playing, "a character, written specifically for him, named 'Thurman Smutney'."

In 2020 he was featured in an episode of Meditative Story about the musical turning point in his life that led up to making Weather Systems, scored with original music.

On October 30, 2020, Bird released Hark!, his first full-length Christmas-themed album. Six songs from the album initially appeared on an EP, also titled Hark!, which was released digitally in November 2019.

On March 5, 2021, Bird released These 13, a collaborative album with Jimbo Mathus.

On June 3, 2022, Bird released Inside Problems via Loma Vista Recordings. The album was produced by Mike Viola and recorded live by Bird with his four-piece band. Additional vocal overdubs were provided by Madison Cunningham. The same month, Bird kicked off the co-headlining Outside Problems tour with Iron & Wine, performed at outdoor venues across the United States.

Influences
Growing up, Bird was surrounded by classical music.  As a child, he was interested in Irish tunes and bluegrass. He also cites English and Scottish folk music as an early influence. His early jazz influences were Johnny Hodges, Lester Young, and Fats Waller. He has also had a number of classical influences such as Claude Debussy, Maurice Ravel, and Béla Bartók. Other influences included jazz, swing, calypso, and folk. Bird has stated that, at 22, he found a lot of indie rock and pop music repetitive and boring, but now understands it better.

The Handsome Family
Andrew Bird appears to have a close relationship with The Handsome Family, an Americana band from Illinois. Covers of their songs have appeared in several of his albums, including "When The Helicopter Comes," on Hands of Glory, "Tin Foiled," on Fingerlings 3, and "Don't Be Scared," from Weather Systems. His album, Things Are Really Great Here, Sort Of… is a ten-song cover album, with a strong country feeling.

The album's liner notes contain a response from Rennie Sparks, the band's lyricist and singer: "Hearing Andrew's version of our songs feels like suddenly spotting a new and shining doorway in the midst of a room I have spent my life in. It's like finding a stairway in the forest leading upward to the sky. His recasting of our work gives me the strange and wonderful pleasure of understanding my own songs better by hearing him perform them."

Instruments and gear
One of Bird's primary instruments is a violin which he acquired when he was 16. His "first serious violin," was custom made by a Polish luthier in Chicago, and Bird had to audition to prove he was worthy of playing it. In 2017, following the release of Are You Serious, he commissioned Peter Seman to build a 5-string violin. The custom instrument features a lower C string (giving it the range of a viola), a unique scroll which bends backwards, and has no corners.

For looping, Andrew Bird uses two Line 6 DL4 delay pedals: one for rhythmic pizzicato, and the other, "is dedicated to the ambient bowed strings." The DL4, on top of being able to loop, can also slow down and speed up loops, lowering or raising the pitch of a recording by an octave in the process. This feature occurs in many of Bird's songs, as well as live performances. He also uses an octave pedal to give the violin the range of a bass.

He began using loop pedals to compensate when performing alone on stage, but later found that looping helped him to "embrace repetition," and compose his songs in a more straightforward manner, since he felt his writing style was too chaotic.

Band members and associated acts
Bird does not have a regular band that he plays with, and personnel changes with each album. Throughout his career, he has performed with a rotating cast of musicians. However, some musicians have appeared on several different albums, and performed with Andrew Bird on multiple tours.

 Martin Dosh - drums, electric piano. Dosh has provided drumming, keyboard, and loops for Armchair Apocrypha and Noble Beast, as well as samples from his own music for songs such as "Simple X" (2007), "Not A Robot, But A Ghost" (2009), and "Take Courage" (2009).
 Alan Hampton - bass guitar, standup bass, guitar, & backup vocals. Hampton first appeared in Hands of Glory in 2012, and has gone on to perform with Bird on Things Are Really Great Here, Sort Of..., Are You Serious, and My Finest Work Yet. Hampton also performed bass for the Bowl of Fire's reunion concert in 2018.
 Tift Merritt - vocals and guitar in the Hands of Glory as well as Things Are Really Great Here, Sort Of...
 Nora O'Connor - backing vocals between The Swimming Hour (2001) and Break It Yourself (2012)
 Kevin O'Donnell - drums, percussion, electric piano. O'Donnell met Bird in college at Northwestern University, played drums in Bird's first band, Charlie Nobody, was the lone consistent member through all Bowl of Fire lineups, and played on all of Andrew Bird's albums from 1996's Music of Hair through 2005's Mysterious Production of Eggs (with an additional appearance on one track from Armchair Apocrypha). After ceasing to be the full-time drummer in Bird's bands, O'Donnell backed Bird again on the "Hands of Glory" & "Are You Serious" tours, and collaborated on the scores to the film Norman and the FX TV series, Baskets. Bird appeared in O'Donnell's jazz ensembles, "Kevin O'Donnell's Quality Six," and "Kevin O'Donnell's National Quartet." 
 Ted Poor - drums on Are You Serious and My Finest Work Yet.
 Jeremy Ylvisaker - guitar and vocals between 2007 and 2012

Hands of Glory
Originally "supposed to be a lark, kind of a between records thing", the Hands of Glory was an old-time band started by Andrew Bird. The group toured and recorded one eponymous album under the name in 2012, and Things Are Really Great Here, Sort Of…the album of covers of The Handsome Family in 2014.

Touring line-up:
 Andrew Bird – vocals, violin, guitar, whistling, glockenspiel, loops
 Tift Merritt – vocals, guitar
 Alan Hampton – bass, guitar, vocals
 Eric Heywood – Pedal Steel
 Kevin O'Donnell – drums

Personal life 
Andrew Bird currently lives in Los Angeles with his wife, Katherine, and their son, Sam.

Accolades

Discography

Studio albums

Companion album
Useless Creatures (2010) (Re-release of bonus disc to Noble Beast 2009)

Live albums
Fingerlings (2002, Grimsey Records)
Fingerlings 2 (2004, Grimsey)
Fingerlings 3 (2006, Grimsey)
Live at Austin City Limits Music Festival 2007: Andrew Bird (2007, Austin City Limits Music Festival)
Live in Montreal (2008, Bella Union)
Fingerlings 4 (2010, Wegawam Music Co.)

EPs 
The Ballad of the Red Shoes (2002)
Live at Bonnaroo Music Festival (2006, Live at Bonnaroo Music Festival)
Soldier On (2007) – European tour EP
Fitz and the Dizzy Spells (2009)
Fake Conversations (2012) – 2011 Tour Live EP
Northwest Passage (2012) – 2012 Tour Live EP
I Want to See Pulaski at Night (2013)
Panthology Songs I (2020)
Panthology Songs II (2020)
Panthology Songs III (2020)

Singles

Other album appearances

 Kiltartan Road – Joy to the Morning (1995)
 Kat Eggleston – Outside Eden (1996, Waterbug Records)
 Lil Ed and Dave Weld with The Imperial Flames – Keep on Walkin''' (1996, Earwig Music)
 Andrew Calhoun – Phoenix Envy (1996, Earwig Music)
 Charlie Nobody – Soup (1996)
 Squirrel Nut Zippers – Hot (1996, Mammoth Records)
 Squirrel Nut Zippers – Perennial Favorites (1998, Mammoth)
 Rose Polenzani – Dragersville (1998, The Orchard)
 Pinetop Seven – Rigging the Toplights (1998)
 Extra Virgin – Twelve Stories High (1999)
 Kevin O'Donnell – Heretic Blues (1999, Delmark Records)
 Andrew Calhoun – Where Blue Meets Blue (1999, Waterbug)
 Sally Timms – Cowboy Sally's Twilight Laments for Lost Buckaroos (1999, Bloodshot Records)
 Squirrel Nut Zippers – Bedlam Ballroom (2000, Hollywood Records)
 The Handsome Family – In the Air (2000, Carrot Top Records)
 Devil in a Woodpile – Division Street (2000, Bloodshot)
 Kevin O'Donnell – Control Freak (2000 · Delmark Records)
 Neko Case – Canadian Amp (2001)
 The Verve Pipe – Underneath (2001, RCA Records)
 Jenny Toomey – Antidote (2001, Misra Records)
 Kelly Hogan – Because It Feel Good (2001, Bloodshot)
 Sinister Luck Ensemble – Anniversary (2002, Perishable Records)
 Abandon Jalopy – Mercy (2002)
 WYEP Live and Direct: Volume 4 – On Air Performances – "Core and Rind" (2002)
 Kristin Hersh – The Grotto (2003)
 The Autumn Defense – Circles (2003, Arena Rock Recording Co.)
 Bonnie 'Prince' Billy – Sings Greatest Palace Music (2004, Drag City)
 Bobby Bare, Jr. – From the End of Your Leash (2004, Bloodshot Records)
 Ani DiFranco – Knuckle Down (2005, Righteous Babe Records)
 My Morning Jacket – Z (2005, ATO Records)
 Bobby Bare – The Moon Was Blue (2005, Dualtone Music Group)
 Emily Loizeau – London Town (in French and English) (2006)
 Dosh – The Lost Take (2006, Anticon)
 Candi Staton – His Hands (2006, Astralwerks)
 Magnolia Electric Co. – The Black Ram (2007, Secretly Canadian)
 KFOG Live From the Archives Volume 14 – "Imitosis"(2007)
 Song of America – "How You Gonna Keep 'Em Down on the Farm" (2007, Split Rock Records/Thirty One Tigers)
 Charlie Louvin – "Sings Murder Ballads and Disaster Songs" (2008, Tompkins Square)
 Todd Sickafoose – "Tiny Resistors" (2008, Cryptogramophone)
 Dosh – Wolves and Wishes (2008, Anticon)
 Final Fantasy – Plays to Please (2008, Blocks Recording Club)
 Dianogah – Qhnnnl (2008, Southern Records)
 Loney, Dear – Dear John (2009)
 Dark Was the Night – "The Giant of Illinois" (Red Hot Organization, 2009)
 Live at KEXP Vol.5 – Oh No (2009)
 Thao with the Get Down Stay Down – Know Better Learn Faster (2009, Kill Rock Stars)
 Dosh – Tommy
 Twistable Turnable Man: A Musical Tribute to Shel Silverstein – The Twistable, Turnable Man Returns (2010, Sugar Hill Records)
 Muppets: The Green Album – "Bein' Green" (2011, Walt Disney Records)
 Norman (Original Motion Picture Soundtrack) (2011, Mom + Pop Music)
 The Muppets: Original Soundtrack – "The Whistling Caruso" (2011, Walt Disney Records)
 Holidays Rule – "Auld Lang Syne" (2012, Hear Music/Concord Music Group)
 Boris Grebenshchikov – Salt (2014, SoLyd Records)
 The Best of Bluegrass Underground 2 – Danse Caribe (2015, PBS Distribution)
 Esperanza Spalding - "The Ways You've Got the Love", Exposure'' (2017, Concord Records)
I Only Listen to the Mountain Goats: All Hail West Texas - "Distant Stations" (2018)

Notes

References

External links

 Official website
 

1973 births
Living people
Fingerstyle guitarists
American fiddlers
American multi-instrumentalists
American rock guitarists
American male guitarists
American male singer-songwriters
American rock songwriters
American rock singers
Old Town School of Folk musicians
People from Jo Daviess County, Illinois
Fat Possum Records artists
Swing revival musicians
Whistlers
Righteous Babe Records artists
Bienen School of Music alumni
Rykodisc artists
American folk rock musicians
Bloodshot Records artists
Singer-songwriters from Illinois
People from Lake Forest, Illinois
Guitarists from Illinois
Indie folk musicians
Lake Forest High School (Illinois) alumni
Electric violinists
21st-century American guitarists
21st-century American violinists
21st-century American male singers
21st-century American singers
American male jazz musicians
Squirrel Nut Zippers members
Bella Union artists
Mom + Pop Music artists
Delmark Records artists
Loma Vista Recordings artists